Shivaram Singh Basnyat was the military commander of Gorkha. After the conquest of Naldum area by the Gorkhalis, he along with Commander Bir Bhadra Thapa conquered Sanga, Panauti, Sankhu and adjacent areas. They received fierce resistance from the Kantipur Kingdom at Sangachok. He died in the defensive battle of Sanga Chowk during Unification of Nepal on 1803 B.S.

Personal life
He was born to Jayaram Singh Basnyat in the clan of Shreepali among Basnyats. He had four sons - Naahar Singh Basnyat, Kehar Singh Basnyat, Abhiman Singh Basnet and Dhokal Singh Basnyat. His third son went on to become Supreme Commander of the Nepalese Army and Chief Minister (Mulkazi) in the Royal Court.

Gallery

References

Sources

Year of birth missing
1747 deaths
Nepalese military personnel
Unification of Nepal
Basnyat family
Nepalese generals
Gurkhas
People of the Nepalese unification
Nepalese military personnel killed in action
18th-century Nepalese people
18th-century Nepalese nobility